Xenolechia aethiops is a moth of the family Gelechiidae. It is found from Ireland, Great Britain and Denmark to the Iberian Peninsula, Sardinia, Italy and Greece. It is also present in North Africa and Turkey and has also been reported from North America, with records from Alberta, Arizona, California, Maine, Saskatchewan and Texas.

The wingspan is about 18 mm. The forewings are dark fuscous.stigmata black, raised, first discal much beyond plical ; a similar spot in disc obliquely before plical, another on fold rather beyond first discal, and a third close beneath second discal. Hindwings considerably over 1, grey.
The larva is dull reddish, segmental incisions greenish ; dots black ; head brown ; plate of 2 black, crescentic, bisected

Adults are on wing in May and June.

The larvae feed on Erica cinerea. Young larvae mine the leaves of their host plant. The mine is probably a small fleck mine. Older larva make a tunnel of silk on a twig. The silk is mixed with frass and leaf fragments. The larvae feed on the leaves from within this tunnel.

References

Xenolechia
Moths of Europe
Moths described in 1845